Blessing Onoko (born 15 December 1969) is a Nigerian boxer. He competed in the men's lightweight event at the 1988 Summer Olympics.

References

External links
 

1969 births
Living people
Nigerian male boxers
Olympic boxers of Nigeria
Boxers at the 1988 Summer Olympics
Place of birth missing (living people)
Lightweight boxers